Soho is an area of the City of Westminster and part of the West End of London, England.

Soho, SOHO or SoHo may also refer to:

Places
Argentina
 Palermo Soho, a neighborhood in Buenos Aires, Argentina

Australia
 South Hobart, Tasmania, "SoHo Village"

Canada
 London, Ontario, "Soho" Neighbourhood aka South of Horton Street

Hong Kong
 SoHo, Hong Kong, “South of Hollywood Road” in Central district

India
 Soho, Unnao, a village in Uttar Pradesh

Republic of Ireland
 Soho, County Westmeath, a townland

Greece
 Sochos, a community in Greece

United Kingdom
 Soho, London, England
 Soho, Somerset, a location
 Soho, West Midlands, England

United States
 SoHo, Manhattan, New York, "South of Houston Street"
 Soho, Tampa, Florida
 Bluff (Pittsburgh), formerly Soho, a neighborhood in Pittsburgh, Pennsylvania

Arts, entertainment, and media

Television
 SoHo (Australian TV channel), an Australian television channel on Foxtel
 SoHo (New Zealand), a New Zealand television channel on Sky Network Television

Other arts, entertainment, and media
 Jessica Soho (born 1964), Filipino television newscaster
 Soho (band), an English pop music trio
 Soho House, a museum in Birmingham, England commemorating Matthew Boulton and his association with James Watt
 Soho House (club), private members' club in Soho, London and internationally/hotel chain
 Soho (magazine), a Colombian magazine
 Soho, a play by Keith Waterhouse
 Soho Press, an American publisher
 "Soho (Needless to Say)", a song by Al Stewart appearing on his 1973 album Past, Present and Future
 "Soho" (featuring J.I.D), a song by Boogie appearing on his album Everythings for Sale

Real estate
 SOHO China, a commercial real-estate company in Beijing
 Soho Square Ponsonby, a failed development in the inner-city suburb of Ponsonby in Auckland, New Zealand
 Trump SoHo, a Manhattan hotel now called The Dominick
 Wangjing SOHO, a three tower complex in Beijing, China

Science
 SOHO; self-organizing holarchic open system, see Holon (philosophy)
 Solar and Heliospheric Observatory, a Sun observation spacecraft

Other uses
 Cabot House or South House, a dormitory at Harvard University nicknamed SoHo
 Saho people, or Soho, ethnic group living largely in the Horn of Africa
 Small office/home office, a category of small business

See also
 Solo (disambiguation)